Gert Trinklein (19 June 1949 – 11 July 2017) was a German football player.

Between 1969 and 1978 Trinklein appeared in 230 matches for Eintracht Frankfurt. In 1979, he moved to the USA, becoming the third German soccer pro besides Franz Beckenbauer and Gerd Müller. Since 1985 he was an independent tradesman and merchandises at sport events. Since 2006 Gert Trinklein was part of the FDP fraction in Frankfurt parliament.

He died in the night from the 11 to 12 July due to his Leukemia disease which was diagnosed in 2011.

Honours 
 German Cup winner in 1974 and 1975 with Eintracht Frankfurt

References

External links
 Gert Trinklein at eintracht-archiv.de

1949 births
2017 deaths
German footballers
Bundesliga players
Rot-Weiss Frankfurt players
Eintracht Frankfurt players
Kickers Offenbach players
North American Soccer League (1968–1984) players
Dallas Tornado players
Footballers from Frankfurt
Deaths from leukemia
Deaths from cancer in Germany
Association football defenders